Ethan Corson is an American attorney and politician who is a member of the Kansas Senate from the 7th district. Elected in 2020, he assumed office on January 11, 2021.

Early life and education 
Corson was raised in Johnson County, Kansas and attended Shawnee Mission South High School. After graduating from high school, Corson played baseball at Garden City Community College. He earned a Bachelor of Science degree in political science, journalism, and communication from the Washington University in St. Louis, followed by a Juris Doctor from the Washington University School of Law.

Career 
After graduating from law school, Corson worked as an attorney in Washington, D.C. and later served as a senior advisor to Penny Pritzker in the United States Department of Commerce. He also served as chief of staff of the International Trade Administration and director of the Office of the Executive Secretariat in the Commerce Department. Corson returned to Kansas to serve as the executive director of the Kansas Democratic Party. In 2019, he was a visiting fellow at the Robert J. Dole Institute of Politics at the University of Kansas.

After Barbara Bollier declined to seek re-election to the Kansas Senate and instead run for the 2020 United States Senate election, Corson announced his candidacy to succeed her. Corson did not face an opponent in the Democratic primary and defeated Republican nominee Laura McConwell in the November general election.

2021-2022 Kansas Senate Committee Assignments
Judiciary
Utilities
Assessment and Taxation
Legislative Post Audit Committee
Joint Committee on Administrative Rules and Regulations
Joint Committee on Corrections and Juvenile Justice Oversight

Personal life 
Corson is married to Jenna Brofsky, an attorney and member of the Fairway, Kansas City Council. They have one son.

References 

Living people
Democratic Party Kansas state senators
Kansas lawyers
Washington University in St. Louis alumni
Washington University School of Law alumni
United States Department of Commerce officials
Obama administration personnel
University of Kansas faculty
Spouses of Kansas politicians
People from Johnson County, Kansas
Garden City Community College alumni
1982 births
21st-century American politicians